Quintin Dove (born June 5, 1998) is an American professional basketball player for the Joondalup Wolves of the NBL1 West. He played college basketball for Cuyahoga Community College and UT Martin.

High school career
Dove attended Villa Angela-St. Joseph High School in Cleveland, Ohio, where he primarily played junior varsity basketball. He failed to join the varsity team rotation on a Division III state championship team which included Carlton Bragg. Following his junior season, Dove moved to Euclid, Ohio and joined the varsity basketball team at Euclid High School. He committed to Rider over offers from Buffalo and Central Connecticut State. However, he instead opted to attend Cuyahoga Community College.

College career
During his freshman season at Cuyahoga, Dove helped the team to a regional final appearance in the NJCAA Division II Tournament. He was forced to carry more of the offense as a sophomore after Wade Lowman and Devon Robinson suffered broken wrists. Dove was named OCCAC Player of the Year as a sophomore and was selected to the NJCAA Division II All-American first team. He led the team to a seventh-place finish at the NJCAA Division II tournament. Dove averaged 18.9 points and 8.4 rebounds per game. He committed to transfer to UT Martin.

On March 8, 2019, Dove scored a career-high 35 points in an 88–81 loss to Jacksonville State. He averaged 13.3 points and 5.2 rebounds per game as a junior while shooting 59.7 percent from the field. Dove was named to the Second Team All-Ohio Valley Conference. On January 30, 2020, he matched his career-high of 35 points and had nine rebounds in a 99–96 loss to Eastern Kentucky. As a senior at UT Martin, Dove averaged 20.2 points and 7.9 rebounds per game, shooting 56.5 percent from the floor. He was named to the First Team All-Ohio Valley Conference. During his UT Martin career, Dove scored 997 points and collected 390 rebounds.

Professional career
On October 27, 2020, Dove signed his first professional contract with BC TSU Tbilisi of the Georgian Superliga. He left the team in April 2021 after averaging 17.1 points and 8.3 rebounds 15 games.

On July 31, 2021, Dove signed with T71 Dudelange of the Total League. In November 2021, he left T71 and joined Sparta Bertrange for the rest of the season.

In October and November 2022, Dove played for Club Atlético Olimpia of the Liga Uruguaya de Básquetbol.

On March 16, 2023, Dove signed with the Joondalup Wolves in Australia for the 2023 NBL1 West season.

Personal life
Dove is the son of Tony and Tracey Dove. His father inspired his interest in engineering, while his mother sparked his love for cooking. Dove's aunt Bonnie Dove played in the WNBA with the Cleveland Rockers.

References

External links
Eurobasket page
RealGM page
UT Martin Skyhawks bio

1998 births
Living people
American men's basketball players
American expatriate basketball people in Georgia (country)
American expatriate basketball people in Luxembourg
American expatriate basketball people in Uruguay
Basketball players from Cleveland
Cuyahoga Community College alumni
Junior college men's basketball players in the United States
UT Martin Skyhawks men's basketball players
Power forwards (basketball)